Turkish mafia is the general term for criminal organizations based in Turkey and/or composed of (former) Turkish citizens. Crime groups with origins in Turkey are active throughout Western Europe (where a strong Turkish immigrant community exists) and less so in the Middle East. Turkish criminal groups participate in a wide range of criminal activities, internationally the most important being drug trafficking, especially heroin. In the trafficking of heroin they cooperate with Bulgarian mafia groups who transport the heroin further to countries such as Italy. Recently however, Turkish mafia groups have also stepped up in the cocaine trafficking world by directly participating in the massive cocaine smuggling pipeline that runs transnationally from South America to Europe. They allegedly have a lucrative partnership with the Venezuelan drug-trafficking organization known as the Cartel of the Suns who ships them cocaine along with criminal elements from Ecuador. Turkish organized crime has pushed into less traditional cocaine markets as well such as into Eastern Europe, the Caucasus, and the wealthy petro-states of the Persian Gulf.  Cosa Nostra and the Turkish Mafia are also known to be extremely close. Criminal activities such as the trafficking of other types of drugs, illegal gambling, human trafficking, prostitution or extortion are committed in Turkey itself as well as European countries with a sizeable Turkish community such as Germany, Netherlands, Belgium, Albania, and the United Kingdom.

Most Turkish crime syndicates have their origin in two regions: the Trabzon province on the Black Sea coast of northeastern Turkey and the East and Southeast Anatolia in the south of the country. The biggest origin is on the coast of the Black Sea, located near Trabzon.

History 
The Turkish Mafia was involved in the weapons trade in the 1970s, and the heroin trade in the 1980s to present, and then moved along into human smuggling.

Bekir Çelenk was one of the members of the Turkish mafia and was involved in the plot to assassinate pope John Paul II.

Ties to deep state
Some members of the Turkish mafia have ties to the deep state in Turkey, including the National Intelligence Organization (MIT), as well as the Grey Wolves. These ties became public during the Susurluk scandal.

Crime groups 
Criminal groups composed of Turks are active throughout the country and in communities with a large ethnically Turkish population. Certain Turkish criminal groups have strong links with corrupt politicians and corrupt members of the local law enforcement. They are active in different sections of organized crime and can often be linked to politically motivated groups, such as the Grey Wolves. This can especially be the case with criminals in immigrant Turkish communities. Powerful and important Turkish criminal organizations mostly have their origin in the Trabzon Province and incorporate members of both the Turkish and the Laz populations.

Eastern Black Sea crime groups 
Even though crime groups composed of Turks come from all over the country, a relatively high amount of them have origins in the Black Sea region of Turkey, especially in Trabzon. These groups consisting of Turks and Laz people are especially strong in the country itself. Eastern Black Sea crime bosses such as Alaattin Çakıcı and Cengiz Telci are known from having links to or being members of the politically motivated group Grey Wolves.

Turkish Cypriot crime groups 
Following the substantial immigration of Turkish Cypriots to London criminal gangs composed of Turkish Cypriots were formed in working-class neighborhoods. Mainly involved in drug trafficking, armed robbery, money laundering these crime clans have more in common with the traditional White British crime firms than with the Turkish mafia.

Kurdish crime groups 

Some ethnically Kurdish crime groups have their origin in the Southeast Anatolia part of Turkey. These groups are believed largely clan based and their main source of income is allegedly believed to be the trafficking of heroin and weapons. Some group of those leaders, such as Hüseyin Baybaşin had been active in Western European countries, especially Great Britain. Some Turkish sources have accused them to have links to the PKK, but never confirmed by authorities.

Zaza crime families in wider Europe 
While ethnically Zaza groups are not noteworthy in Turkey itself, large Alevi Zaza immigrant communities have formed in Great Britain and Germany. Criminal gangs from these communities have links with other Turkish and Kurdish crime bosses and are involved in drug trafficking and contract killing. An example in London is the brutal turf war between Turkish gangs, such as the so-called Tottenham Boys and the Hackney Turks. The Tottenham Boys and Hackney Turks are mainly ethnic Kurdish gangs, but they also have some Turkish members.

Notable Turkish mafiosi 
Arif family
Sarıalioğlu Ailesi
Alaattin Çakıcı
Ayvaz Korkmaz
Sedat Peker
Hakan Ayik
Mahmut Yıldırım
Nurullah Tevfik Ağansoy
Dündar Kılıç
Nedim Imac

See also
Turkish organised crime in Great Britain
Turkish mafia in Germany
Susurluk scandal
Allegations of Grey Wolves drug trafficking

References 

Mafia
Organized crime by ethnic or national origin
Transnational organized crime
Organised crime groups in Australia
Turkish-Australian culture
Organised crime groups in Belgium
Organised crime groups in England
Organised crime gangs of London
Organized crime groups in France
Organised crime groups in Germany
Organised crime groups in the Netherlands
Organized crime groups in Turkey
Organized crime groups in Sweden